John Donald Currey (9 August 1932 – 18 December 2018), was a British zoologist who lectured at the University of York where he specialised in the biomechanics of mineralised tissues such as bone.

Early life 

He was born in Scunthorpe in 1932 and later the family moved to Pickwick, Wiltshire. He went to St Edward's School, Oxford, and completed his national service before reading about zoology at Brasenose College, Oxford, where he was received his first award in 1956. After graduation he served as a whaling inspector in the Antarctic on board the whaling ship Southern Harvester.

Career 

He worked as a demonstrator in the zoology department at Oxford and completed his Ph.D. in 1961. He moved to the new biology department at York University in 1964. He spent a year in 1969 at the Veterans Administration Hospital and Case Western Reserve University, Cleveland. In 1970, he returned to York as a professor. Although his main area of research was the mechanics of bone, he also studied the snail Cepaea. He was head of the Department of Biology from 1984 to 1990, after which he became Deputy Vice Chancellor. He retired in 1999 and was named as professor emeritus.

He was one of the first to point out that diffuse damage and microcracks can help make the bone stronger. “When bone starts to break thousands of little microcracks form. These microcracks are positioned sensibly in relation to the histological structure of the bone, but we don’t know where they form in relation to the ultrastructure. Typically when microcracks form they only reach a few microns in length before they come to a halt. The big question is, what brings them to a halt?”.

In 2013 the European Society of Biomechanics awarded him the Huiskes Medal for Biomechanics. He published over one hundred papers between 1959 and 2017.

Personal life 

He married Jillian Vine in 1960, and they had two boys and a girl.

Books 

 Animal Skeletons (1970). John D. Currey. Institute of Biology. Studies in biology: no. 22. New York, St. Martin's Press
Mechanical Design in Organisms (1982). Stephen A. Wainwright, W. D. Biggs, John D. Currey. Princeton University Press
 The Mechanical Adaptations of Bones (1984). John D. Currey. Princeton University Press. 
 Bones: Structure and Mechanics (2002). John D. Currey. Princeton University Press.

References

External links 

 JMBBM Frontiers Webinar: Celebrating the life and work of John Currey – November 19, 2020

1932 births
2018 deaths
People from Scunthorpe
Alumni of Brasenose College, Oxford
People educated at St Edward's School, Oxford
20th-century British biologists
Academics of the University of York
Military personnel from Lincolnshire
20th-century British military personnel